Anthony Perkins (1932–1992) was an American actor known for his role as Norman Bates in the Psycho films.

Anthony Perkins or Tony Perkins may also refer to:

 Tony Perkins (politician) (born 1963), American politician and president of the evangelical Family Research Council.
 Tony Perkins (news anchor) (born 1959), American television news anchor.

See also
 Antonio Perkins (born 1981), former American football player.
 Anthony Perkins, fictional character in Scream 4 (2011).